CFL Class 2000 is a class of electric multiple units operated by CFL on the Luxembourg railway network. They were built in 1990-1992 by a consortium of De Dietrich, ANF and Alstom and are similar to SNCF's Z 11500 class.

History 
The Z2 family of multiple units was designed by Francorail and Ateliers de construction du Nord de la France. CFL selected a variant of the Z 11500 class for their network.

Names 
Four 2000s have been named after places in Luxembourg. They carry the appropriate crests on the side of the driving cab.
 2001: Mersch
 2003: Betzdorf
 2004: Pétange
 2018: Troisvierges

Between 2021 and 2024, the 2000 series will be replaced by 34 Coradia Stream railcars from the Coradia family produced by Alstom, part of which will be used to increase the CFL fleet..

Construction 
The individual cars are built with steel frames.

Technical 
The multiple working system allows three units to be worked as a single train with one driver.
The individual vehicles are numbered (in UIC format) as 94 82 00 20xx 1-y and 94 82 00 20xx 2-y, where 20xx is the unit number and y the check digit.

Operations 
Within Luxembourg 2000s can be found on almost all lines interworking with 2200 series EMUs and push-pull services worked by 3000s & 4000s. Outside Luxembourg they are used in conjunction with SNCF Z 11500s to work the Luxemburg - Metz - Nancy services and Bettembourg - Dudelange - Volmerange-les-Mines.

Interior

References

External links 
 D'Serie 2000 vun der CFL op rail.lu 
 D'Serie 2000 vun der CFL op Spoorgroep Luxemburg 
Class 2000 at the official CFL website 

Alstom multiple units
2000
De Dietrich Ferroviaire
Train-related introductions in 1990
25 kV AC multiple units